Stephen Verona (September 11, 1940 – July 13, 2019) was an American filmmaker, photographer and painter.  He was known for writing, producing and directing the 1974 film The Lords of Flatbush.  He was also nominated for the Academy Award for Best Live Action Short Film at the 44th Academy Awards for making the short film The Rehearsal.

Early life and education
Verona was born on September 11, 1940 in Springfield, Illinois.  He was raised in Brooklyn, where he attended Madison High School.

Personal life and death
At the time of his death, Verona was married to Ann Verona.  Verona died at the age of 78 of lung cancer in Los Angeles on July 13, 2019.

Filmography

References

External links
 

Film producers from Illinois
James Madison High School (Brooklyn) alumni
People from Brooklyn
American film producers
American male screenwriters
American film directors
American film editors
1940 births
2019 deaths
Screenwriters from Illinois
20th-century American screenwriters